Everybody Hates Chris is an American television semi-autobiographical sitcom that is inspired by the memories of the teenage years of comedian Chris Rock. The show is set from 1982 to 1987, although Rock himself was actually a teenager from 1978 to 1984, having been born in the year 1965.

The show was created by Rock and Ali LeRoi, and was originally developed for Fox, before being passed over. It was then picked-up by UPN where it aired for its first season in 2005. UPN merged with The WB to become the CW a year later, where it aired its remaining three seasons. In 2009, Rock announced that the series' end had matched up with his own past and he felt it was time to end the show.

Characters

 Tyler James Williams as Chris, a skinny, nerdy, African-American teenager – portraying Chris Rock in his younger years.
 Terry Crews as Julius – Chris' caring, hard-working, penny-seeking father.
 Tichina Arnold as Rochelle – Chris' loving, conscientious, demanding, temperamental, disciplinarian mother.
 Tequan Richmond as Drew – Chris' easy-going, good-looking, popular, athletic, bigger, younger brother.
 Imani Hakim as Tonya – Chris' little sister, spoiled by her father, and often spiteful to Chris.
 Vincent Martella as Greg Wuliger – Chris' small, nerdy white schoolmate and best friend.

Synopsis
The show is a family sitcom, patterned on Chris Rock's recollection of his teenage years growing up in the 1980s with a wholesome, tight-knit, African-American family, while living in drug-and-gang infested Bedford–Stuyvesant, a neighborhood of Brooklyn, New York, and also attending a cross-town, white-dominated, public high school.

The real-life Chris Rock provides intermittent narration throughout the show, at times interjecting his young self's thoughts or sometimes simply recounting the situation he's describing.

Chris' family is firmly dominated by strong, loving parents: Julius, a hard-working, frugal laborer who works two jobs while remaining carefully loyal to his wife,  Rochelle, a conscientious and powerful housewife and mother who is fiercely protective of the family, while also being fiercely demanding of all in it, especially eldest son Chris.

The series starts just after the parents have moved their children "out of the [low-income housing] projects," and into a more-upscale two-story apartment in Brooklyn's Bedford–Stuyvesant neighborhood—known for its roughness as "Bed-Stuy, do-or-die."

Chris is a skinny, nerdy young teen. His mother decides to send him to a mostly-white school across town ("two bus rides away") in an ethnic-Italian neighborhood to ensure he gets a better education. The school is slyly named "Corleone Junior High School" (an apparent reference to the fictional Corleone mafia family from the movie The Godfather or its real-life parallel, the Corleonesi).

Chris find the new school difficult to adjust to because of social ostracism and the ire of a red-haired bully named Caruso. Ms. Morello, a well-meaning white teacher, treats Chris with naive, condescending assumptions derived from crude racial/ghetto stereotypes. The bright spot in school is Chris's best friend, Greg (played by Vincent Martella)—a smaller but similarly nerdy white kid.

At home, Chris is often left in charge of his siblings—his younger-but-bigger brother, Drew, and an ornery little sister, Tonya. Mother Rochelle usually keeps a firm grip on the family, while their exhausted breadwinner father, Julius, struggles to catch a little sleep between jobs.

Chris interacts with various characters in the neighborhood—diverse personalities based on real people Rock would see as a kid in his community. These personalities include some hoodlums who try to take advantage of him, a demented old homeless man, a shrewd, miserly-but-grandfatherly storekeeper named Doc, and Doc's neurotic, paranoid, combat-veteran nephew. For several episodes, an overbearing neighbor lady is played by Whoopi Goldberg, grandmother of the pretty girl next door.

The show—laced with comedy and farce—is primarily about adolescence and family life in inner-city poverty, the determined struggles of good, decent parents to provide a better life and values for their family, and the challenges their children present to them, and to each other.

Reception
Everybody Hates Chris received critical acclaim. The American Film Institute selected Everybody Hates Chris as one of the best 10 television series of 2007, stating that the show "provides a very real look at growing up in America – a challenge that demands a discussion of race and class often absent from television today."

Before it even aired, previewers were rating it highly, with The Futon Critic calling it "UPN's best comedy to date... light years ahead of anything [UPN] has tried before... one of the genre's best [examples] in recent memory," adding that it was "Authentic for its timeframe, [while not] trying too hard" -- telling audiences they had "to check this one out." 

While comparing it to The Cosby Show, the New York Times cited its more down-to-earth scenario, and summed it up as the first teenager-centered show in years where the protagonist's "main problem is not [mere] adolescent angst, but real life", adding that Rock made the show "funny, not maudlin or mean."

During the 2006 William S. Paley Television Festival (which "celebrates the excellence and diversity of American television," sponsored by the Museum of Television and Radio), the show was honored with a screening of the pilot episode and a subsequent episode ("Everybody Hates a Part-Time Job") at the Directors Guild of America Theatre Complex in Los Angeles, followed by a panel discussion with cast and crew, led by museum and media leaders.

Everybody Hates Chris was named one of the Best School Shows of All Time by AOL TV. Common Sense Media's Marjorie Kase and Shanel Walker & Emily Kofoed gave the show 4 stars, and said it was "a prime example of how to take serious issues and approach them in a humorous yet thought-provoking way. The series is innovative, funny, and stereotype-defying – enjoyable for teens and their parents."

On review aggregation website Rotten Tomatoes the series has an approval rating of 95%. The site's critics consensus for the first season states, "Aided by Chris Rock's humorous narration, Everybody Hates Chris' first season offers refreshingly honest insights into real life by addressing race, class, and adolescence."

Broadcast history

U.S. broadcast history
UPN
 September 22, 2005 – May 11, 2006: Thursdays 8:00 PM/7:00 PM (new)

The CW
 October 1 – 8, 2006: Sundays 7:00 PM/6:00 PM (new)
 October 16, 2006 – March 2008: Mondays 8:00 PM/7:00 PM (new)
 March – May 2008: Sundays 8:00 PM/7:00 PM (new)
 October 3 – November 28, 2008: Fridays 8:00 PM/7:00 PM (new)
 December 12, 2008 – May 8, 2009: Sundays 5:00 PM/4:00 PM (New)
 September 2009 – present: syndication

Nielsen stats

Syndication
The show aired regularly on broadcast TV during the week, and aired on Fox, MyNetworkTV  and The CW affiliates. The show started airing on September 7, 2009, on Nick at Nite, becoming the youngest syndicated show on the channel. The series has since aired on TeenNick, TV One, Up, MTV2, VH1, BET and BET Her. The series currently airs on Fuse, Bounce TV and the Laff network.

In Canada, the show has aired on the networks YTV and Much. In the UK, the show has aired on Channel 5, Paramount Comedy 1 and now Sky Comedy. In Brazil, the series premiered on RecordTV in October 2006 and, as of 2022, reruns are still regularly broadcast on Sundays due to its immense popularity in the country.

Awards

Everybody Hates Chris won NAACP Image Awards for Outstanding Writing in a Comedy Series (for Ali LeRoi), Outstanding Actress in a Comedy Series (for Tichina Arnold), and Outstanding Actor in a Comedy Series (for Tyler James Williams). It has also been nominated for a Golden Globe and three Emmy Awards. In December 2008, Entertainment Weekly listed the Kwanzaa episode from this show as seventh on the magazine's "Must List: 10 Holiday Things We Love."

Home media
All four seasons of Everybody Hates Chris were released on DVD by Paramount in Region 1 and Region 2. The complete series was released on DVD on August 18, 2009.

Streaming
The series is available to stream on Paramount+, Amazon Prime Video (through Paramount+), and Hulu, and can be streamed for free on CW Seed, ITV X,  Pluto TV, Tubi and Peacock. The series is often streamed with Season 1 incomplete, but Paramount+ and Peacock now have the complete season set.

The series is also available to be purchased on the iTunes Store, Google TV, YouTube, and Vudu.

Reboot
In March 2021, an animated reboot of the series was announced to be in development with Chris Rock returning as narrator. In July 2021, Sanjay Shah, executive producer and co-showrunner of Central Park, was reported to be writing and producing the reboot. In August 2022, it was reported the animated reboot would be titled Everybody Still Hates Chris. It will be released on Comedy Central and Paramount+.

References

External links

 

 
2000s American single-camera sitcoms
2000s American black sitcoms
2000s American teen sitcoms
2005 American television series debuts
2009 American television series endings
UPN original programming
The CW original programming
English-language television shows
Cultural depictions of American men
Cultural depictions of comedians
Television series by 3 Arts Entertainment
Television series by CBS Studios
Television shows set in New York City
Television shows filmed in Los Angeles
Coming-of-age television shows
Television series about families
Television series set in the 1980s
Television series set in 1982
Television series set in 1983
Television series set in 1984
Television series set in 1985
Television series set in 1986
Television series set in 1987
Television series created by Chris Rock
Television series created by Ali LeRoi